Everywhere and Nowhere is a 2011 coming of age British drama film focusing on the identity struggles of Ash (James Floyd) a young British Pakistani who is torn between the traditions of middle-class family life and his passion for DJing. The film comes from Kidulthood director Menhaj Huda.

Synopsis
Young and educated, Ash leads a privileged life but finds himself between two cultures: hedonistic, multi-cultural London with his friends and a traditional Pakistani family upbringing in the middle class suburbs. Tormented by the idea of entering the family business, Ash rebels and he finds identity through blending classic Bollywood soundtracks with contemporary electronic music.

Cast
James Floyd as Ash Khan
Adam Deacon as Zaf
Shivani Ghai as Sairah Khan
Neet Mohan as Riz
Elyes Gabel as Jaz
Katia Winter as Bella
Shaheen Khan as Rubena Khan
Simon Webbe as Ronnie
James Buckley as Jamie
Art Malik as Uncle Mirza 
Saeed Jaffrey as Zaf's Dad
Ronny Jhutti as Salim
Amber Rose Revah as Yasmin

Reception
The film received largely negative reviews from critics, with only 1 from 12 critics giving it a positive write-up on the review aggregator Rotten Tomatoes.

However James Floyd got significant critical praise for his lead performance, including Screen International, The Guardian  and Time Out.

References

External links
 
 

2011 films
British Pakistani films
2010s English-language films
British coming-of-age drama films
Films about interracial romance
Youth culture in the United Kingdom
2010s coming-of-age drama films
Films directed by Menhaj Huda
2010s British films